No. 541 Squadron RAF was a Royal Air Force Squadron formed as a photographic reconnaissance squadron in World War II.

History

Formation in World War II
The squadron formed at RAF Benson on 19 October 1942 from 'B' and 'F' flights of No. 1 PRU, and was equipped with Spitfires to fly missions over Europe. It also received Mustang aircraft in July 1944 and operated some Lancaster bombers for UK mapping purposes after hostilities ceased. One of the squadrons first commanders following its formation was John Saffery.

Wartime detachments operated from Gibraltar in 1943, providing imagery of North Africa, and from RAF Leuchars in the same year with missions flown into Norway looking for the battleship Scharnhorst.

It disbanded in October 1946, with the Lancaster Flight becoming No. 82 Squadron.

Postwar
The squadron reformed at RAF Benson on 1 November 1947, and in December 1950 its Spitfires were replaced with Meteors which it operated from RAF Bückeburg, RAF Laarbruch and RAF Gütersloh before it disbanded again on 7 September 1957.

Aircraft operated

References

Sources

External links

 History of No.'s 541–598 Squadrons at RAF Web
badge on RAF Heraldry Trust website

Aircraft squadrons of the Royal Air Force in World War II
541
Reconnaissance units and formations of the Royal Air Force
Military units and formations established in 1942